This is a list of destinations operated to by Scandinavian Airlines (SAS) . The list includes destinations served by airlines with which SAS has or previously had a wet lease agreement, such as CityJet, Cimber Sterling, PrivatAir, Scandinavian Airlines Ireland, or Widerøe. It includes the destination's country (or applicable territory), city, airport name, and the airline's notable status marked where applicable - such as seasonality, as a hub, as a future destination (with an accompanying launch date), or as a terminated destination.

List

See also
List of SAS Group destinations for all the SAS Group destinations
List of Widerøe destinations for the SAS Group's Norwegian regional destinations

References

Lists of airline destinations
SAS Group destinations
Destinations
Star Alliance destinations